Afrocanthium siebenlistii is a species of flowering plant in the family Rubiaceae. It is endemic to Tanzania, found only in the Usambara and Uzungwa Mountains.

References

Vanguerieae
Endemic flora of Tanzania
Vulnerable flora of Africa
Taxonomy articles created by Polbot